International cricket in 2009 is defined as the season of international cricket between May and August 2009 in all cricket playing countries, as well as all international matches scheduled for the 2009 English cricket season. Matches between September 2008 and March 2009 are defined as belonging to the 2008–09 season, while matches between September 2009 and March 2010 will fall under the 2009–10 season.

Season overview

Pre-season rankings

April

ICC World Cup Qualifier

The 2009 ICC World Cup Qualifier is a cricket tournament that took place in April 2009 in South Africa. It was the final qualification tournament for the 2011 Cricket World Cup.

The top four teams (Ireland, Canada, Kenya and Netherlands) qualified for the 2011 Cricket World Cup, and Scotland retained the One-day international, meanwhile Afghanistan
gained the ODI status for the following four years and also automatically qualify for the ICC Intercontinental Cup. The bottom two teams was relegated to 2011 ICC World Cricket League Division Three. The final and the play-offs for third and fifth place was official ODIs.

Group stage

 Team qualifies for Super Eights
 Team moves into the 9th Place Playoff Semifinals

9th Place Playoffs

Super Eights

 Team qualifies for 2011 Cricket World Cup and gains ODI status
 Team gains ODI status
 Team plays in the 7th place playoff

Playoffs

Final standings

Pakistan vs Australia in the United Arab Emirates

 This series was moved from Pakistan to UAE for security reasons.

May

West Indies in England

ICC World Cricket League Division Seven

Group stage

The 2009 ICC World Cricket League Division Seven will be held in May 2009 in Guernsey. The two leading teams of the tournament will be promoted to Division Six later the same year.

(R)-replayed

Finals and play-offs

Final Placings

June

ICC World Twenty20

Group stage

Super Eights

Knockout stage

India in the West Indies

July

Pakistan in Sri Lanka

Canada in Scotland

Scotland and Canada also played an Intercontinental Cup match. See main article.

Kenya in Ireland

Kenya and Ireland also played an Intercontinental Cup match. See main article.

Australia in England

Bangladesh in the West Indies

Canada in the Netherlands

Canada and the Netherlands also played an Intercontinental Cup match. See main article.

New Zealand in Zimbabwe
New Zealand were due to tour Zimbabwe for a series of three One Day Internationals in 2009 but the tour was cancelled due to political and security reasons, and the New Zealand Cricket discussed possible fixtures in 2010 but made no definitive decisions.

August

Bangladesh in Zimbabwe

Kenya in Canada

Kenya and Canada also will play an Intercontinental Cup match. See main article.

New Zealand in Sri Lanka

Sri Lanka, New Zealand, and India will play in a tri-series during this time.

In the T20I No. 120 Jacob Oram took the second hat-trick in Twenty20 International

Afghanistan in Zimbabwe

Afghanistan and Zimbabwe XI played an Intercontinental Cup match. See main article.

Ireland in Scotland

Ireland and Scotland also played an Intercontinental Cup match. See main article.

England in Ireland

Australia in Scotland

Afghanistan in the Netherlands

Afghanistan and the Netherlands also played an Intercontinental Cup match. See main article.

ICC World Cricket League Division Six

Group stage
The 2009 ICC World Cricket League Division Six will be held in August and September 2009 in Singapore. The two leading teams of the tournament will be promoted to Division Five in 2010.

(R)-replayed

Finals and play-offs

Final Placings

After the conclusion of the tournament the teams were distributed as follows:

Season summary

Result Summary

 lose their ODI status in the 2009 ICC World Cup Qualifier.
 won ODI status in the 2009 ICC World Cup Qualifier.

Stats Leaders

Test

ODI

T20I

Milestones

ODI
  played and won their first ODI Match, vs , on 19 April.
  Chris Gayle played his 200th ODI Match, on 23 May. (57th All-time)
  Yuvraj Singh reached 7,000 runs in ODI, vs West Indies on 28 June. (28th in All time)
  Mahela Jayawardene played his 300th ODI Match, on 1 August. (14th in All time)

Test
  Andrew Strauss reached 5,000 runs scored in Test, vs  on 8 July. (75th in All time)
  Ricky Ponting reached 11,000 runs scored in Test, vs  on 9 July. (4th in All time)
  Mohammad Yousuf reached 7,000 runs scored in Test, vs  on 20 July. (34th in All time)
  Kumar Sangakkara reached 7,000 runs scored in Test, vs  on 24 July. (35th in All time)
  Daniel Vettori reached 3000 test runs and 300 Test wickets in Test, vs  on 26 August. (8th in All time)

References

2009 in cricket